The General Automobile Insurance Services, Inc., or simply The General, is a licensed insurance agency that is a subsidiary of PGC Holdings Corp. that focuses on auto insurance. In 2012, the company was acquired by American Family Insurance; The General brand still remains as a separate brand. The General specializes in insuring drivers who are considered "high risk" whose car insurance premiums are typically more expensive.

History 
The General began selling insurance in 1963, under the company name Permanent General Agency. Later, the name was changed to Permanent General Assurance Corporation (PGAC), and in 2012, it was announced that Permanent General and all affiliated companies will unify under the one brand name "The General."

Since 2016, retired professional basketball player Shaquille O'Neal has endorsed and appeared in numerous commercials for the company.

Operating territory  
The General is based in Nashville, Tennessee, and has several physical store operations throughout the state of Louisiana, and internal offices in Arizona, California, Colorado, Florida, Georgia, Ohio, and Texas among other states.

Awards 
In 2012, The General and Ken Roberts Productions received three Telly Awards for television commercials in the Animation category.  A Silver Award was won for the "Baseball" commercial, and Bronze Awards were won for "Football" and "Snowboard".
In 2019, The General was certified a "Great Place to Work".

References

External links 
 The General

Financial services companies established in 1963
Insurance companies of the United States
Companies based in Nashville, Tennessee
American companies established in 1963
1963 establishments in Tennessee
2012 mergers and acquisitions